Simone Natalie Vigod is a Canadian scientist, Head of the Department of Psychiatry at Women's College Hospital and Professor in the Department of Psychiatry at the University of Toronto in Toronto, Ontario, Canada. She focuses her research on perinatal mood disorders and has conducted some of the largest studies worldwide on maternal mental illness around the time of pregnancy.

Education and training 
Vigod graduated from McGill University in 1999 with her Honours Bachelor of Science degree in Psychology. She then earned her medical degree from the University of Toronto, where she completed her psychiatric residency in 2009, and an MSc in Clinical Epidemiology in 2011.

Career 
Following her residency in psychiatry, Vigod joined Women's College Hospital to continue her research on reproductive health. 

In 2014, Vigod became the program lead for Women's College Hospital's Reproductive Life Stages (RLS) program. The aim of the program was to provide care to women with mental health issues across their reproductive life cycle. Under her leadership, the team created and evaluated Mother Matters, an online therapist-facilitated support group for women across Ontario with postpartum mental health issues.

At the same time, she was also appointed the Shirley A. Brown Memorial Chair in Women’s Mental Health Research for a term of five years. In this role, Vigod collaborated with an international team of women’s mental health researchers to develop a primer on PPDs. In November 2018, Vigod was appointed the chief of psychiatry at Women’s College Hospital.

While serving in these leadership roles, Vigod developed an online patient decision aid to help women make choices about antidepressant use in pregnancy. In 2020, Vigod studied mental health support for mothers during the COVID-19 pandemic by looking at demographic data and mental health visits for more than 137,000 people in Ontario. Following this, she was named the winner of The Royal-Mach-Gaensslen Prize for Mental Health Research as an outstanding mental health researcher enabling future exploration and discovery.

She appears regularly in the media on maternal and pregnancy issues.

Current positions 

 Head, Department of Psychiatry, Women’s College Hospital
 Shirley A. Brown Memorial Chair in Women’s Mental Health Research and Senior Scientist, Women’s College Research Institute
 Professor, Department of Psychiatry, Temerty Faculty of Medicine, University of Toronto
 Senior Adjunct Scientist, ICES, Toronto, Ontario

Awards and honours 
 The Royal-Mach-Gaensslen Prize for Mental Health Research (2021)
 Shirley A. Brown Memorial Chair in Women's Mental Health Research (2018)
 Canadian Institutes for Health Research (CIHR), New Investigator Award (2015-2020)
 Ontario Mental Health Foundation New Investigator Award (2013-2016)

References 

Living people
Year of birth missing (living people)
Place of birth missing (living people)
Canadian psychiatrists
McGill University alumni
University of Toronto alumni
21st-century American women scientists
20th-century American women scientists